Lipski (plural: Lipscy, feminine form: Lipska) was a Polish nobility family

History 
The family originated from Lipe in Greater Poland.

Notable members

Andrzej Lipski (1572–1631) – Bishop, Grand Chancellor of the Crown
Jacek Lipski (1799–1872)  – engineer, ironmaster
Jan Aleksander Lipski (1690–1746) – Cardinale
Józef Lipski (1772–1817) – general, leader of the Greater Poland Uprising in the Kalisz region
Józef Lipski (1769–1812) – rotmistrz,  major-general
Józef Lipski (1894–1958) – politician and diplomat
Wojciech Lipski (1805–1855) – landlord

Coat of arms 
The family coat of arms was Grabie.

Residences

References

 

pl:Lipski